Pierre Boivin, OC (born October 28, 1953) is a French Canadian businessman and was president of the Montreal Canadiens from September 2, 1999, through June 30, 2011, succeeding Ronald Corey.

Business
At the age of 25, Boivin founded Norvinca Sports. It would become the largest sporting goods distributor in Canada. In later years, he would become the chief executive officer for Canstar Inc. The company owned the Cooper and Bauer sports equipment brands.

Sports
Prior to the beginning of the 1999–2000 Montreal Canadiens season, Boivin was named as the new president of the Montreal Canadiens. One of his first key moves was during the 2000–01 Montreal Canadiens season, when he fired general manager Rejean Houle and head coach Alain Vigneault in November 2000.

Boivin resigned as the president of the Montreal Canadiens on June 30, 2011, being succeeded by Geoff Molson, majority co-owner of the club. Boivin has remained with the organization as a member of the board of directors.

On February 12, 2019, Boivin was registered as a lobbyist in Quebec with the goal of negotiating the sale of the Peel Basin to private buyers on behalf of a Montreal-based group headed by Stephen Bronfman. The group's goal is to bring back an MLB team to the city of Montreal.

Politics
Boivin starred in a public service announcement for the Canada 2006 Census. In 2009, he was made an Officer of the Order of Canada "for the leadership he has demonstrated as an entrepreneur and administrator in the sports industry, and for the work he has done to help develop community and philanthropic activities".

Personal life
Pierre is married to Lucie Nadeau and is the father of three children: Patrick, Catherine, and Richard. Boivin is a distant cousin of Patrick LaForge, the former president and CEO of the Edmonton Oilers. His son Patrick was president of the Montreal Alouettes.

References

External links
 Montreal Canadiens – Official biography of Pierre Boivin

1953 births
Living people
Businesspeople from Montreal
French Quebecers
Montreal Canadiens executives
National Hockey League executives
Officers of the Order of Canada